Anna in the Tropics is a play by Nilo Cruz. It won the 2003 Pulitzer Prize for Drama.

Plot
The play is set in Ybor City, a section of Tampa and the center of the cigar industry. When Cuban immigrants brought the cigar-making industry to Florida in the 20th century, they carried with them another tradition.  As the workers toiled away in the factory hand rolling each cigar, the lector, historically well-dressed and well-spoken, would read to them.  It was the lector who informed, organized and entertained the workers until the 1930s, when the rollers and the readers were replaced by mechanization.

In the play, the lector reads Anna Karenina, sparking the characters' lives and relationships to spin out of control.

Characters
Santiago, owner of a cigar factory, late 50s
Cheché, his half-brother, half-Cuban, half-American, early 40s
Ofelia, Santiago's wife, 50s
Marela, Ofelia and Santiago's daughter, 22
Conchita, Marela's sister, 32
Palomo, Conchita's husband, 41
Juan Julián, the lector, 38
Elíades, local gamester, runs cockfights, 40s

Productions
Anna in the Tropics was commissioned and originally produced by New Theatre, Miami, Florida, Rafael del Acha, Artistic Director, Eileen Suarez, Managing Director, in 2002 with support from the NEA/TCG Theatre Residency Program for Playwrights.

The South Coast Repertory presented the play on its Julianne Argyros Stage. It ran from 28 September to 19 October 2003. Directed by Juliette Carrillo, the cast included Jonathan Nichols (Eliades/Palomo), Tony Plana (Santiago), Geoffrey Rivas (Cheché), Onahoua Rodriguez (Marela), Adriana Sevan (Conchita), Karmín Murcelo (Ofelia) and Julian Acosta (Juan Julian).

The play started performances on Broadway at the Royale Theatre on November 4, 2003, opening on November 16th. Directed by Emily Mann, the cast included Jimmy Smits (Juan Julian), Priscilla Lopez (Ofelia), Daphne Rubin-Vega (Conchita), Victor Argo (Santiago), Vanessa Aspilaga (Marela), John Ortiz (Eliades/Palomo) and David Zayas (Cheché). The play closed on February 22, 2004, after 15 previews and 113 performances 

The first U.S. national tour starting in September 2004 and ending in February of 2005 was a co-production between Dallas Theater Center, Arizona Theatre Company, and Pasadena Playhouse. Directed by Richard Hamburger, the cast included Al Espinosa (Juan Julián), Jacqueline Duprey (Conchita), Timothy Paul Perez (Eliades/Palomo), Apollo Dukakis (Santiago), Javi Mulero (Cheché), Adriana Gaviria (Marela), and Karmín Murcelo (Ofelia).

L.A. Theatre Works presented Anna in the Tropics as part of its 2004–2005 season. Directed by Jose Luis Valenzuela, the cast included Jimmy Smits, Onahoua Rodriguez, Adriana Sevan, Jonathan Nichols, Winston Rocha, and Herbert Siguenza.

On September 16, 2005 and translated as Ana en el trópico, the Spanish version opened in Madrid at the Teatro Alcázar and was directed by Nilo Cruz himself. The cast included: Luis Fernando Alvés (Palomo/Elíades), Joan Crosas (Santiago), José Pedro Carrión (Cheché), Toni Acosta (Marela), Lolita Flores (Chonchita), Teresa María Rojas (Ofelia), Pablo Duran (Juan Julián), Itziar Arza, Alfonso Ramos and Marian Sanz de Acedo (cigarreras/os).

The play was presented in the UK at the Hampstead Theatre in London. Directed by Indra Rubasingham, it ran from 30 November 2005 to 15 January 2006. The cast included Diana Quick, Rachael Stirling and Joseph Mydell.

Due to the coronavirus pandemic lockdown, Repertory Philippines' production of "Anna in the Tropics" closed on March 13, 2020 after two previews. The production was designed and directed by Joey Mendoza.

Recognition
Anna in the Tropics was widely regarded as a "long shot" for the 2003 Pulitzer Prize for Drama, mainly because it had not been seen in New York City. The play premiered at the New Theatre in Coral Gables, Florida and had to compete with Edward Albee's The Goat, or Who Is Sylvia? and Richard Greenberg's Take Me Out for the coveted award.

Cruz, a Cuban-born playwright living in New York, remarked,

It's wonderful.  I cannot believe it.  The other day I went to the bookstore and I saw a book by William Kennedy.  He won the Pulitzer for Ironweed, which I adore.  I was standing there looking at his books and thinking how amazing it was that this writer won a Pulitzer, and now I've been given one, too.  I think I'm still in shock.  I haven't completely acknowledged the grandness of the award.

His past works, such as Two Sisters and a Piano, have earned him a reputation for writing lyrical, atmospheric plays with powerful emotions and language.

Anna in the Tropics was honored with two nominations at the 2004 Tony Awards. The show was nominated in the category of Best Play and Best Featured Actress in a Play (Daphne Rubin-Vega)

Film adaptation
The Hollywood Reporter reports that Academy Award nominee, Lee Daniels (Precious) has signed on to develop a film based on the play—which is being produced by Mankind Entertainment.

References

External links
  (2003 production)
 
 Anna in the Tropics at South Coast Repertory
 Anna in the Tropics at L.A. Theatre Works which offered an audio broadcast version in September 2007 as part of its Play's the Thing series
Long Beach Shakespeare Company produced Anna in the Tropics, Directed by Denis McCourt April/May 2011

American plays
Pulitzer Prize for Drama-winning works
Hispanic and Latino American plays
Broadway plays
Works based on literary characters
Plays set in Florida
Cuban-American literature
Tampa, Florida in fiction